Rajyapala or Kamboja-Vamsa-Tilaka was the founder of the Kamboja Pala dynasty of Bengal. This dynasty had ruled over northern and western Bengal. Four rulers of this dynasty are known who ruled, either over north-west Bengal or parts thereof, from second half of tenth century to the first quarter of the 11th century. The last known king of Kamboja Pala dynasty was Dharmapala, who was the ruler in Dandabhukti division, during the first quarter of the 11th century.

Rajyapala, The Ornament of Kamboja Family
Irda copper plate addresses king Rajyapala with the epithet of Kamboja-Vamsa-Tilaka (i.e. the ornament of the Kamboja family). He is also addressed as the first (Prthu) ruler in the Kamboja-Pala dynasty.

According to scholars, the Pala rulers of Bengal used to recruit cavalry and mercenary soldiers from the Kamboja (due to the lack of native horses in Bengal and Assam) of north-west. Some of the Kamboja militarist or civilian adventurers are believed to have settled permanently in Bengal and one of their descendants viz. Rajyapalal ultimately carved out an independent kingdom in north Bengal when the Pala power weakened in the second half of the tenth century CE (a situation similar to that of the Western Roman Empire and the foederati).

According to Dr H. C. Ray, the ancestors of the Kamboja rulers of Bengal came from west with Gurjara Pratiharas. The Kambojas had joined the forces of Gurjara Pratiharas and there were separate regiments of the Kambojas in the Pratihara army which were entrusted with the defence of north-eastern borders of the Pratihara empire. The Kambojas did not leave the province after the collapse of Pratihara power. Rather, they took advantage of the weakness of the Pala kings and set up an independent kingdom which was not a difficult task for them. Expelled from Hindukush/Pamirs, the Kambojas are stated to have formed a large contingent of the Gurjaras. Dr Hem Chander Raychaudhury also states that the Kambojas came to Bengal with the armies of the Gurjara Pratiharas. Dr R. C. Majumdar also agrees with the view that the Kambojas may have come to Bengal with Pratiharas when they conquered part of the province.

The Bhaturya Inscriptions refers to a ruler named Rajyapala whose commands are obeyed by the Mlechchas, Angas, Kalingas, Vangas, Odras, Pandyas, Karnatas, Latas, Suhma, Gurjara, Kiratass and in Cina.

According to George E Somers, "while the claim is certainly exaggerated, it is significant that Rajyapala's conquests included Anga, Vanga, Suhma, but not Gauda or Pundra". So, according to Dr Somers and other scholars, this may attest that only north or north-west Bengal was the home province of Rajyapala. The scholars, therefore, have identified this Rajyapala of Bhaturiya inscriptions with the Kamboja ruler, Rajyapala of the Irda copper plate.

Rajyapala Kamboja: a Rashtrakuta general?
According to some scholars including George E Somers, it is also possible that the Rajyapala of Bhaturiya inscriptions was a camp-follower of the Rashtrakuta army on march in the south and north and that this Rajyapala was a General of Kamboja origin and accompanied the Rashtrakuta ruler in his march into Bengal; and later carved out an independent Kamboja Pala kingdom in northern Bengal, probably during the reign of Gopala-II. See link:

Imperial titles by Rajyapala
Kamboja Rajyapala has been described as a great ruler. He was succeeded by his two sons, Narayanapala and Nayapala. While Rajyapala had assumed the imperial titles of Kambojavamshatilaka Paramasaugata maharajadhiraja parameshvara paramabhattaraka Rajyapala, his son Nayapala assumed the titles of Parameshvara paramabhattaraka maharajadhirAja Nayapaladeva.

Religious beliefs of Rajyapala
The Irda copper plate inscriptions use Paramasaugata epithet for Rajyapala of Kamboja lineage. This attests that Rajyapala was a worshipper of Buddha.

Kamboja-Vamsa-Tilaka Rajyapala vs Kamboja.nvaya Gaudapati
The Dinajpur Pillar Inscription makes mention of a certain Kamboja king called the Kambojanvaya Gaudapati (i.e. lord of Gauda, born in Kamboja family). Some scholars tend to link Kamboja-Vamsa-Tilaka Rajyapala of the Irda copper plate with this Kambojanvaya Gaudapati of Dinajpore pillar inscriptions. But whereas the Kambojanvaya Gaudapati is attested as the builder of lofty temple of Lord Sambhu and hence undoubtedly a devotee of Siva, Rajyaplaya of Irda copper plate, on the other hand, is styled as Paramasaugata i.e. a devotee of Buddha. Thus, in all probability, "Kambojanvaya Gaudapati" and "Kamboja-Vamsa-Tilaka Rajyapala" are two separate historical personages (Dr J. L. Kamboj).

In conclusion
The scholars are yet not in agreement on the exact year of the establishment of the Kamboja Pala rule in north and western Bengal by Rajyapala of Kamboja lineage; nor is it clear as to the duration he had ruled his kingdom. Rajyapala Kamboja was succeeded by his elder son Narayanapala Kamboja.

References

Books and periodicals
The History and Culture of Indian People, The Classical Age, Dr R. C. Majumdar, Dr A. D. Pusalkar
The History and Culture of Indian People, The Age of Imperial Kanauj, Dr R. C. Majumdar, Dr A. D. Pusalkar
The History and Culture of Indian People, The Struggle For Empire, Dr R. C. Majumdar, Dr A. D. Pusalkar
The Rise and Decline of Buddhism in India, 1995, (The Kamboja-Pala Dynasty (c. AD 911-92), Chapter 9), Kanai Lal Hazra.
Dynastic History of Magadha, Cir. 450–1200 A.D., 1977, Bindeshwari Prasad Sinha – Magadha (Kingdom)
The Dynamics of Santal Traditions in a Peasant Society, George E. Somers – 2003
The People and Culture of Bengal: A Study in Origins, Volume 1— Part 1 & 2, 2002, Annapurna Chattopadhyaya.
Ancient India, 2003, Dr V. D. Mahajan
A Critical Study of The Geographical Data in the Early Purana, 1972, Dr M. R. Singh
History of Bengal, Part I, 1971, Dr R. C. Majumdar
Some Historical Aspects of the Inscriptions of Bengal, 1962, B. C. Sen
The Dynastic History of Northern India, II, Dr H. C. Ray
Some Kshatria Tribes of Ancient India, 1924, Dr B. C. Law
Candelas of Jejabhukti, R. K. Dikshit
Hindu World, Vol I, 1968, Benjamin Walker
Jataka, 1957, Fausboll
District Gazetteer, Rajashahi,1915
India and Central Asia, 1956, Dr P. C. Bagchi
History of the Origin and Development of the Bengali Language, 1926, Dr S. K. Chatterjee
Early History of India, 1957, Dr V. A. Smith
Decline of the Kingdom of Magadha, 1953, B. P. Sinha
Dacca University Studies, Vol I, No 2
Bharatvarsha, 1344 (Bangala Samvata)
Library of India Office, Vol II, Part II
Modern Review, 1937, N. G. Majumdar
Epigraphia Indica, Vol V, XII, XXII, XXIV
Epigraphia Indica, Vol XVII., p 305
History of the Koch Kingdom, C. 1515-1615–1989, pe 8, D. Nath – History
Journal of Oriental studies – 1954, p 381, University of Hong Kong Institute of Oriental Studies
Journal of the Royal Asiatic Society of Great Britain and Ireland – 1834, p 434, Royal Asiatic Society of Great Britain and Ireland.
Indian Historical Quarterly, Vol XV-4, 1939
Bihar Through the Ages, 1958, Ed, R. R. Diwarkar
Journal of Proceedings of Royal Society of Bengal (NS), Vol VII
Ancient Kamboja, People and the Country, 1981, Dr J. L. Kamboj

See also
Kambojas
Kamboja Dynasty of Bengal
Pala Empire

Kambojas
Dynasties of Bengal
Founding monarchs